The Nigerian Conservation Foundation is an environmental non-governmental organization which works to preserve the natural resources and biodiversity of Nigeria. The Foundation was founded in 1980 by Shafi Edu and has worked since then on a number of resource management and conservation projects across Nigeria.  Chief Ede Dafinone is the current Chairman of the Foundation and Dr. Muhtari Aminu-Kano is the Director-General.

One of the founders was Akintola Williams.
The Akintola Williams Arboretum at the Nigerian Conservation Foundation headquarters in Lagos is named in his honor.The Foundation is involved in conservation efforts on a number of fronts. It engages in lobbying work both at the national and state levels. It also has a number of educational initiatives both to raise awareness of environmental issues in Nigeria and to encourage sustainable practices. It works with higher education, primary and secondary schools, and with the general public through local initiatives in target areas.  Its scientific staff is engaged in research and management plans in reserves, parks, and wildlife habitats across the country. It also advises industries on sustainable development and environmental impacts for their projects in Nigeria.  The foundation also promotes environmental tourism with the goal of expanding awareness of Nigeria's natural resources and also creating economic incentives for continued and expanded preservation. The Nigerian Conservation Foundation (NCF) has called on all Nigerians to take very useful urgent actions in conserving the remaining species of the Pangolin and it seeks help of all concerned Nigerians in creating huge awareness about the need for pangolin conservation.

The NCF has partnerships with a number of international environmental groups including the World Wildlife Fund, the International Union for Conservation of Nature, BirdLife International, Wetlands International, Fauna and Flora International, and the Wildlife Conservation Society. It has also partnered with several industry groups including Chevron and BG Group on issues involving Nigeria's growing oil and gas industry. The NCF established Lekki Conservation Centre in 1990 which houses the National Secretariat of the foundation while their regional office is in Calabar, Cross River state in Nigeria.

In 1992, the National conservation Foundation was recognized by the UN Environmental Program, which added it to its Global 500 Roll of Honour, a group of individuals and organizations making important contributions to the environment.

According to Climate Score Card, "NCF is regarded as one of the best environmental NGOs in the country. Currently, they have projects in 9 different states ranging from the Participatory Forest Management Project in Taraba State to  Management of Becheve Nature Reserve, Obudu Cattle Ranch, Obudu, Cross River State . Their best practice climate project would have to be the Biodiversity Action Plan (BAP) in Edo state."

Centres 
 Lekki Conservation Centre (LCC)
 Becheve Nature Reserve
 Finima Nature Park
 Abuja Conservation Centre.

Organisational structure 
The Organisational Structure of the Foundation is made up of the Board of Trustrees (BOT) headed by a President and the National Executive Council, headed by a Chairman. The current President of the Board of Turstees is Izoma Philip Asiodu CFR, CON while the Chairman of the National Executive Council is Chief Ede Dafinone.

Achievements 

 The foundation in 1984 assisted in developing National Conservation Strategy.

 In 1985, due to the support they gave the government, the Endangered Species Decree was enacted.

 Also, in 1990, the Lekki Conservation Centre was established by the Foundation.

 They founded the Hadejia-Nguru wetland conservation project in 1992.
 NCF has influenced the establishment of FEPA (Federal Environment Protection Agency)
 Management of Okomu games before it became a national park.

Projects 
Some of the previous projects of NCF include:

1. Afi mountain reserve and Gashaka Gumti NP both aiming at conservation of ape and elimination of poverty among local people.

2. Vulture save Zone : The project was carried out to ensure the protection of vulture in the two vulture states; Anambra and Enugu with the training of 38 individual at awgu Local government area of Enugu and 13 from Awka entity at  Anambra.

Upcoming projects

The coordinator of NCF Green recovery Nigeria ,Folake salawu has announced the creation of additional reserves in different area by partnering with national parks in the country. The location of the reserves will be determined by the stakeholders in the six geo-political zones as part of green recovery plan just after Federal Government has allocated space for the intending reserves.

Also, the Kwara state government is planning to plant 2.5 million trees by 2047 in partnership with NCF in order to fight loss of trees in the state, the project is to involve about 100 communities.

References

External links

NCF Facebook page

Environmental organizations based in Nigeria
Organizations based in Lagos
Environmental organizations established in 1980
1980 establishments in Nigeria